Canada competed at the 1904 Summer Olympics in St. Louis, United States.
These Games were the second at which Canadian athletes participated. As in 1900 they did not compete under the Canadian flag, national teams not being introduced until the next Olympics. Unofficially, however, it was a very successful Olympics for Canada with Canadian competitors winning the fourth most medals. However this was largely because most Europeans decided not to make the long trip to compete in the games. The Canadian athletes were a unified group for the first time and were unofficially regarded as a team.

Medalists

The most notable Canadian medal winner was Etienne Desmarteau who placed first in the 56 pound weight throw. He was fired as a Montreal police officer when he left to compete at the games. Returning as a medallist and local hero he was reinstated, but died the next year of typhoid.

Canada won two golds in team sports, two thirds of Canada's total in all summer games. The Canadian soccer team from Galt, Ontario won gold and a team known as the Winnipeg Shamrocks won the field lacrosse title. The third-place finishers were also from Canada, a team of Mohawks from a reserve near Brantford.

Of note was Peter Deer, a full blooded Iroquois Indian, who competed in the 800 & 1500 metres races, he was the first Native person to represent Canada outside her borders.  Deer was a mechanic by day and was a member of the Montreal Amateur Athletics Association. He was 23 in 1904, he came from Caughnawaga, a native village on the South Bank.

Results by event

Athletics

Football

Canada made its first football appearance in 1904, sending a club team to St. Louis.  The team defeated each of the two United States club teams in the round-robin tournament.  The International Olympic Committee later recognized the tournament as the official one and awarded the club a gold medal for its performance.

 Summary

 Standings

 Matches

 Roster

Golf

Lacrosse

Two teams from Canada played in the 1904 lacrosse competition. The Winnipeg Shamrocks defeated the team from St. Louis by a score of 8-2 in the final to win gold.

Rowing

References

sports-reference

Nations at the 1904 Summer Olympics
1904
Olympics